Roger Ruskin Spear (born 29 June 1943 in Hammersmith, London) is an English sculptor, multimedia artist and multi-instrumentalist (saxophones, clarinet, piano, guitars, percussion) who was a member of the Bonzo Dog Doo-Dah Band.

Career
After Spear dissolved his jazz band New Jungle Orchestra at the end of 1964, he joined the Bonzo Dog Doo-Dah Band. He wrote such songs as "Shirt", "Tubas in the Moonlight" and "Trouser Press". He is known for his robot creations, and the theremin leg – in "Noises for the Leg", amongst other tunes.

After the Bonzos parted company, Spear was a member of the short-lived band biGGrunt, with Vivian Stanshall. He also toured with his solo show "Roger Ruskin Spear and his Giant Kinetic Wardrobe" (a.k.a. "Giant Orchestral Wardrobe"). In 1979 Spear formed Tatty Ollity with Dave Glasson, a former member of Bob Kerr's Whoopee Band, Sam Spoons and Dave Knight. The band released a single, "Punktuation", on Rough Trade. In 1982 Spear took part in The Cut Price Comedy Show, a weekly confection of corny sketches and ironic end-of-the-pier jokes. Produced by ITV region TSW and screened on the then-new Channel 4, it ran for ten programmes and was then dropped.

In 1985 Spear and Dave Glasson formed The Slightly Dangerous Brothers, producing a single, "Let's Talk Basic", with a video featuring some of Spear's robot creations. In 1991 Spear played saxophone in Vivian Stanshall's show Rawlinson Dog Ends at the Bloomsbury Theatre, London. Spear had also played on Stanshall's album Teddy Boys Don't Knit (1981 Charisma CAS 1153). 

Spear appeared on albums such as Go Man Gorman (1977), a solo outing for John Gorman of The Scaffold. Spear was also a member and co-founder of Bill Posters Will Be Band.

Until 2014 Spear performed regularly with Three Bonzos and a Piano, which is made up of Rod Slater and Sam Spoons, both former members of the Bonzo Dog Band, together with Dave Glasson on piano and, often, Andy Roberts, formerly of The Liverpool Scene and The Scaffold, on guitar.

Spear later played with an amalgamation of Bill Posters and Bonzo musicians called BonzoBills, involving Sam Spoons, Biff Harrison, Dave Glasson, Megs Etherington, Chris Lowe and Jim Heath, a former member of Harry Strutters Hot Rhythm Orchestra).

In addition to his musical activities, Spear taught 3D design part-time at the Chelsea College of Art before retiring.

Family
Spear is the son of the satirical artist and lecturer Ruskin Spear.

Solo discography
 Rebel Trouser EP. (UK) UP 35221, 1971.
 Electric Shocks LP. United Artists (UK) UAG 29381, 1972.
 Unusual LP. United Artists (UK) UAS 29508, 1973.
 Electric Shocks Plus CD. DJC (i.e. Dave Clague) DJC005, 2002. Contains Electric Shocks and Rebel Trouser.

References

1943 births
Living people
People from Hammersmith
English trumpeters
Male trumpeters
Bonzo Dog Doo-Dah Band members
21st-century trumpeters
21st-century British male musicians
British comedy musicians
British surrealist artists